Joseph Horan (6 November 1878; 19 February 1961) was an American racecar driver who competed in the early years of the Indianapolis 500.

Biography 
Horan was born on November 6, 1878 in Troy, New York. During a practice run for the 1911 Indianapolis 500 on May 24, 1911, he was in an accident and broke his leg. One year later, Horan returned to qualify and drive in the race's second running.

References

Indy 500 results

1878 births
1961 deaths
Indianapolis 500 drivers
American racing drivers